Sica Sica Municipality (Aymara: Sika Sika) is the first municipal section of the Aroma Province in the  La Paz Department, Bolivia. Its seat is Sica Sica.

Geography 
Some of the highest mountains of the municipality are listed below:

See also 
 Jach'a Jawira

References 

  Instituto Nacional de Estadística de Bolivia  (INE)

Municipalities of La Paz Department (Bolivia)